The 2021–22 Eastern Michigan Eagles men's basketball team represented Eastern Michigan University during the 2021–22 NCAA Division I men's basketball season. The Eagles, led by first-year head coach Stan Heath, played their home games at the George Gervin GameAbove Center in Ypsilanti, Michigan as members of the Mid-American Conference.

Previous season
In a season limited due to the ongoing COVID-19 pandemic, the Eagles finished the 2020–21 NCAA Division I men's basketball season 6–12, 3–11 in MAC play to finish in 10th place in the MAC. They failed to qualify for the MAC tournament.

Following the season, the school announced it was parting ways with head coach Rob Murphy after 10 seasons. On April 12, 2021, the school hired EMU alum and former Kent State, Arkansas, and South Florida head coach Stan Heath as the team's new head coach.

Offseason

Departures

Incoming transfers
On April 28, 2021, the NCAA officially adopted a measure that would allow athletes in all sports to transfer once without sitting out a season beginning with the 2021–22 season.

Recruiting class

2021 recruiting class

Roster

Schedule and results

|-
!colspan=9 style=| Exhibition

|-
!colspan=9 style=| Non-conference regular season

|-
!colspan=9 style=| MAC regular season

References

Eastern Michigan Eagles men's basketball seasons
Eastern Michigan
Eastern Michigan Eagles men's basketball
Eastern Michigan Eagles men's basketball